The 2011 Safari Sevens were the 16th annual edition of the Safari Sevens.

Tournament administration

Venue
After 15 years at the RFUEA Ground and growing attendances annually, the Kenya Rugby Football Union decided to take the tournament to the Nyayo National Stadium for the first time.  Nyayo is a football and athletics stadium built in 1983 to host the 1987 All-Africa Games and has a capacity of 30,000; the 2010 African Athletics Championships were also held here.  It is the headquarters for the Kenya Football Federation and Athletics Kenya.  The rationale for the move was to allow room for more spectators as part of the KRU's bid to have the tournament included in the IRB Sevens World Series by 2015; it was reported that IRB observers were in the country to monitor the event.

There were some worries prior to the event about the move, the area is notorious for robbers who attack motorists and pedestrians and at least one murder has been recorded there two years ago.  The Police put in place a security plan including road closures to ensure the tournament passed without incident.  Parts of Langata Road and Aerodrome Road were closed to motorists apart from those bearing VIP stickers; parking and shuttle busses were also put in place for the fans between the stadium and Highway Secondary School, All Saints Primary School and Kenya Railways Sports Club.  Security fears were vindicated after a woman was raped leaving the tournament.  Other commentators have said that the area is no more dangerous than the surroundings of the RFUEA Ground and that the attack was partially a result of bad luck or poor judgement to decide to walk home rather than take a taxi or bus.

Dates
For the first time the tournament was held in early November, rather than the traditional June, in order to avoid clashes with other world class rugby events so that more prestigious teams could send sides to participate and thus further raise the prominence of the event in the world rugby calendar.  The Rugby World Cup 2011 ended in October and the IRB Sevens World Series began two weeks later in late November.  The hope is that the Safari Sevens will become a warm-up event to (and possibly even an integral part of) future IRB Sevens World Series.

Ticketing
Standard tickets cost KSh.300/= (Friday) or KSh.400/= (Saturday and Sunday) per day (KSh.1,000/= for all three days - equal to £6.39 stg., €7,43 or US$10.25).  VIP tickets were KSh.1,000/= (Friday) or KSh.2,000/= (Saturday and Sunday) per day, KSh.4,000/= for all three days - equal to £25.58 stg., €29,73 or US$41.00).

Match officials
A strong panel of match officials blending experienced regulars from previous editions of the Safaricom Sevens with up and coming match officials from the region and overseas referees with international experience.  Hong Kong's Lee Wing Yi Gabriel became the first top female referee to officiate at the Safari Sevens (though Kenya's own Sarah Agola, who also officiated, was a veteran of six tournaments having made her officiating debut at the 2005 tournament).

The 2011 tournament match officials

Men's tournament

Participating Teams
Hosts Kenya, Uganda and Bristol University from the United Kingdom are the only sides to have played in this annual event since its inception in 1996.

The teams were as follows.

Pool A

Pool B

Pool C

Pool D

Teams unable to attend
Teams slated to attend but later withdrew included:

Pool stages
Results form the pool stages.

Pool A

Pool B

Pool C

The first tiebreaker is the head-to-head result between the tied teams, followed by difference in points scored during the tournament.  Spain and Samoa tied on points and their head to head result; Samoa won Pool C by virtue of the fact they scored a total of 140 points to Spain's 76.

Pool D

Knockout stage
Results from the knockout stage.

Cup

Plate

Bowl

Shield

Women's Tournament Result

Round-robin stage

Knockout stage

Doreen Remour touched down for Kenya, which was converted by Irene Awino.

Men's Veteran Results

Pool stage

Pool 'A'

Pool 'B'

Knockout stage

Boys

Pools

Pool 'A'
Tanzania made history by putting together a national representative under-19 side for the event.  Zimbabwe also sent a national representative side as they have done to several previous Safari Sevens tournaments.  Uganda sent their school national champions Hana Mixed School.

All eight of the Kenya provinces were represented in the tournament.

Pool 'B'

Knockout stage

Boy's Cup

Boy's Plate

Boy's Bowl

Boy's Shield

Girls

Group stage

Pool 'A'

Pool 'B'

Knockout stage

Girl's Cup

Girl's Plate

Girl's Bowl

Girl's Shield

References

2011
2011 in African rugby union
2011 rugby sevens competitions